Edisto Glacier is a glacier flowing northeast between Felsite Island and Redcastle Ridge into the head of Edisto Inlet. It was named by the New Zealand Geological Survey Antarctic Expedition, 1957–58, for the USS Edisto, the first vessel to visit the Edisto Inlet area.

References 

Glaciers of Borchgrevink Coast